The Pyrenean desman also called Iberian desman (Galemys pyrenaicus) is a small semiaquatic, globally threatened mammal related to moles and shrews, and, along with the Russian desman (Desmana moschata), is one of the two extant members of the tribe Desmanini. The species occurs in north and central parts of Spain and Portugal, French Pyrenees, and Andorra, but severe range contractions have been documented across its geographic distribution.

Description

Pyrenean desmans have a long, sensitive nasal trompe provided with hypertrophic vibrissae and chemo-/mechanosensitive Eimer’s organs helping prey detection, and large webbed feet with fringed hairs to increase the swimming surface, and can close off their nostrils and ears to stop water penetration.

The desman's body is covered in dark, brownish fur, with the exception of its tail and nose. The nose is black and is covered in vibrissae (facial hairs), which it uses to feel the movement of prey as it sticks its nose into mud or crevices while searching for food. The Pyrenean desman can live at least 3.5 years. The animals are mostly nocturnal, and eat small invertebrates, mostly aquatic macroinvertebrates. They breed up to three times a year, with the period of gestation lasting around thirty days.

Three to four young are born in each litter. The males have a slightly larger territory than the female. Both males and females scent mark. They are thought to be aggressive towards other adult members of the species.

Habitat
Pyrenean desmans are proficient swimmers, suited to their aquatic habitat, although their claws also allow them to be good at climbing. They mostly occur in fast-flowing, mountainous rivers with shallow waters and good riparian galleries. The habitat of the Pyrenean desman is under threat, and recent studies have shown dramatic declines in species occurrence in several parts of its range in the last few decades

Conservation 
Threats include habitat fragmentation and alteration, invasive species (e.g. the American mink), and climate change.

The Photo Ark
On May 4, 2018, National Geographic reported that the Pyrenean desman was the 8,000th animal photographed for The Photo Ark by Joel Sartore.

References

Talpidae
Desman, Pyrenean
Desman, Pyrenean
Fauna of the Pyrenees
Fauna of Andorra
Fauna of Portugal
Fauna of Spain
Vulnerable animals
Vulnerable biota of Europe
Mammals described in 1811